VSE Corporation is a diversified products and services company providing repair services, distribution, logistics, supply chain management support and consulting services for land, sea, and air transportation assets in the public and private sectors. VSE serves commercial customers as well as the United States Government, including the United States Department of Defense (DoD), federal civilian agencies, and other customers. Operations include parts supply and distribution, and maintenance, repair, and overhaul (MRO) services for ground transport and aviation; vehicle and equipment refurbishment; logistics; engineering; IT and health care IT solutions; and energy and mismanagement consulting services.

Business units (sectors)
VSE was incorporated in Delaware in 1959 and the parent company serves as a centralized managing and consolidating entity for three operating groups, each of which consists of one or more wholly owned subsidiaries or unincorporated divisions. VSE's operating segments include:

Aviation Distribution & Repair 
1st Choice Aerospace
CT Aerospace
Kansas Aviation
 VSE Aviation distribution
 VSE Miami (formerly Air Parts & Supply Co "APSCO")
 VSE Aviation Singapore
 VSE Aviation GmbH (Germany)
 Wheeler Fleet Solutions 
Federal and Defense Services 
Energetics Incorporated (technology and management consulting firm serving public- and private-sector clients)
Akimeka (information technology (IT) and data service provider)

Company Segments
AVIATION
(Distribution & Repair Services):
VSE’s Aviation segment provides aftermarket repair and distribution services to commercial, cargo, business and general aviation, military/defense and rotorcraft customers globally. Core services include parts distribution, component and engine accessory maintenance, repair and overhaul (MRO) services, rotable exchange, and supply chain services. 

FLEET
(Distribution & Fleet Services):
VSE's Fleet segment provides parts, inventory management, e-commerce fulfillment, logistics, supply chain support and other services to support the commercial aftermarket medium- and heavy-duty truck market, the United States Postal Service (USPS), and the United States Department of Defense. Core services include parts distribution, sourcing, IT solutions, customized fleet logistics, warehousing, kitting, just-in-time supply chain management, alternative product sourcing, engineering and technical support.

FEDERAL & DEFENSE
(Logistics & Sustainment Services):
VSE's Federal & Defense segment provides aftermarket maintenance, repair and overhaul (MRO) and logistics services to improve operational readiness and extend the life cycle of military vehicles, ships and aircraft for the U.S. Armed Forces, federal agencies and international defense customers. Core services include base operations support, procurement, supply chain management, vehicle, maritime and aircraft sustainment services, IT services and energy consulting.

History
VSE Corporation was established in 1959 to provide engineering and technical services to the owners and operators of transportation and equipment assets and large, mission critical fleets (ships, vehicles and aircraft.)

VSE is a publicly traded (NASDAQ: VSEC), ISO 9001:2015-registered SCM, MRO, and professional services company. VSE's subsidiary, Wheeler Fleet Solutions received its seventh U.S. Postal Service Supplier Performance Award for 2013. VSE Aviation, Inc. is an FAA and EASA certified independent provider of MRO and SCM services for aircraft engines and engine accessories. VSE's Federal & Defense Services support to the U.S. Department of Defense has resulted in VSE's ranking among the top 100 defense contractors, top 10 foreign military sales contractors, and top 50 Navy contractors in the nation.Source: Company Overview

References

External links

 VSE Corporation web site
VSE Aviation, Inc. (corporate headquarters for VSE Corporation's aviation interests)
Wheeler Fleet Solutions(Somerset, PA based fleet inventory management subsidiary)
Energetics Incorporated (Columbia, MD based consulting subsidiary)
Akimeka (Healthcare IT & IT Services subsidiary)

Business services companies established in 1959
Companies based in Virginia
Companies listed on the Nasdaq
1959 establishments in Virginia